General elections were held in Belgium on 11 August 1864, the first full general elections since 1857. The snap elections were called upon the loss of a parliamentary majority for the liberal government of Charles Rogier and a hung parliament, following the death of liberal representative Charles Cumont on 10 July 1864. In the last few parliamentary sessions preceding the elections, all Catholic members quit the Chamber, resulting in it not being quorate. The Chamber was disbanded by order of 16 July.

Although the Catholics received the most votes for seats in the Chamber of Representatives, the result was a victory for the Liberal Party, which won 64 of the 116 seats.  Liberals gained three seats in Bruges, one seat in Charleroi, two seats in Ghent, one seat in Namur and one seat in Soignies. Catholics gained one seat in Aalst, one seat in Tongeren and one seat in Waremme. This returned a parliamentary majority for the Liberals.

Voter turnout was 76.7%, although only 103,717 people (2.1% of the population) were eligible to vote.

Results

Chamber of Representatives

References

1860s elections in Belgium
General
Belgium
Belgium